Jan Brożek (Ioannes Broscius, Joannes Broscius or Johannes Broscius; 1 November 1585 – 21 November 1652) was a Polish polymath: a mathematician, astronomer, physician, poet, writer, musician and rector of the Kraków Academy.

Life
Brożek was born in Kurzelów, Sandomierz Province, and lived in Kraków, Staszów, and Międzyrzec Podlaski.

He received his primary education in Kurzelow, then continued education in Krakow. In 1604, he enrolled in the Faculty of Liberal Art at the Kraków Academy (now Jagiellonian University), where he received his baccalaureate on 30 March 1605. In January 1614, he became the head of the Astronomy and Astrology Faculty. From 1620 to 1624, he stayed in Padua, where he studied medicine at the University of Padua and received his doctorate in medicine on 11 August 1623. He served as rector of Jagiellonian University.

He was the most prominent Polish mathematician of the 17th century, working on the theory of numbers (particularly perfect numbers) and geometry. He also studied medicine, theology and geodesy. Among the problems he addressed was why bees create hexagonal honeycombs; he demonstrated that this is the most efficient way of using wax and storing honey.

He contributed to a greater knowledge of Nicolaus Copernicus' theories and was his ardent supporter and early prospective biographer. Around 1612 he visited the chapter at Warmia and with the knowledge of Prince-Bishop Simon Rudnicki took from there a number of letters and documents in order to publish them, which he never did. He contributed to a better version of a short biography of Copernicus by Simon Starowolski. "Following his death, his entire collection was lost"; thus "Copernicus' unpublished work probably suffered the greatest damage at the hands of Johannes Broscius."

Brożek died at Bronowice, now a district of Kraków. One of the Jagiellonian University's buildings, the Collegium Broscianum, is named for him.

Works 

 "Geodesia distantiarum" (1610);
 "Dissertatio astronomica" (1616);
 "Dissersatio de cometa Astrophili" (1619);
 "De dierum inaequalitate" (1619);
 "Arithmetica integrorum" (1620);
 "Apologja pierwsza kalendarza rzymskiego powszechnego" (1641);
 "Apologia pro Aristotele et Euclide" (1652);
 "De numeris perfectis disceptatio" (1637);
 "Epistolae ad naturam ordinatarum figurarum plenius intelligendam pertinentes" (1615);
 "Peripatheticus Cracoviensis" (1647);
 "Sermo in synodo Luceornensi" (1641);
Discurs Ziemianina z Plebanem (Discourse between the Squire and the Vicar, 1625);
Gratis, albo Discurs I Ziemianina z Plebanem (Gratis, or Discourse I between the Squire and the Vicar);
Przywiley, albo Discurs II Ziemianina z Plebanem (Privilege, or Discourse II between the Squire and the Vicar);
Consens, albo Discurs III Ziemianina z Plebanem (Consensus, or Discourse III between the Squire and the Vicar).

See also
List of Poles—Astronomy
List of Poles—Mathematics
Perfection—Perfect numbers
Honeycomb conjecture
Physician writer
List of Roman Catholic scientist-clerics

Notes

References

Inline

Other
 Jan Nepomucen Franke, "Jan Brożek (J. Broscius) Akademik Krakowski..." Jagiellonian University Press, Kraków, 1884;
"Jan Brożek, Wybór Pism" [Jan Brożek, Selected Writings] Vol. 1, Edit. Henryk Barycz, Vol. 2, Edit. Jadwiga Dianni. P.W.N., Warszawa, 1956;
Jan Chroboczek, Jan Brożek:  Mathematician, Astronomer and Biographer of Copernicus (1585–1652), The Polish Review, vol. LV, no. 2, 2010, pp. 169–93. and "Three letters on Copernicus published by Joannes Broscius in 1618", pp 1–20 in Sudhoffs Archiv, 97-1, Stuttgart 2013;
Krzysztof Tatarkiewicz "Brzozek czy Brożek, materiały do rozważań w 350 rocznicę..." 2nd Edit. Manuscript available at the RCIN Web page of the Inst. Mat. Pol. Acad. Sci. (IMPAN), Warsaw, deposited by the author in 2003.

External links
 Jan Brożek / Joannes Broscius Mathematician, Historian of Science, University Professor and Benefactor
 Galileo Project entry
 Works by Jan Brożek in digital library Polona

1585 births
1652 deaths
Jagiellonian University alumni
17th-century Polish astronomers
17th-century Polish physicians
Catholic clergy scientists
17th-century Polish–Lithuanian Roman Catholic priests
University of Padua alumni
Academic staff of Jagiellonian University
Rectors of the Jagiellonian University
17th-century Polish mathematicians